Ríos Rosas is a station on Line 1 of the Madrid Metro. It serves the Ríos Rosas ward of the city.

History 
The station opened on 17 October 1919 and was one of the original eight stations on the network.

References 

Line 1 (Madrid Metro) stations
Railway stations in Spain opened in 1919
Buildings and structures in Ríos Rosas neighborhood, Madrid